Buchanan, also previously known as Grand Bassa on some maps, is the third largest city in Liberia, lying on Waterhouse Bay, part of the Atlantic Ocean. As of the 2008 census, Buchanan had a population of 34,270. Of this, 16,984 were male and 17,286 female.

The town was popular with refugees during the Liberian Civil War as it largely escaped the fighting. Fishing is an important industry in the town. The town also has isolated beaches and lagoons.

History 

In December 1832, the Port Cresson colony was founded in what is now Buchanan, by black Quakers of the New York and Pennsylvania Colonization Societies. It was established as a settlement for black emigrants from the United States. The emigrants named the settlement in honor of Elliott Cresson, a Philadelphia merchant and Pennsylvania Colonization Society founder who funded their voyage to Liberia.

In June 1835, Bassa tribal members destroyed the Americo-Liberian colony of Port Cresson.

A month later, a new colony called Bassa Cove was founded by black Quakers of the Young Men's Colonization Society of Pennsylvania. The Bassa Cove colony was incorporated into Liberia on April 1, 1839.

Throughout much of the 1850s, Buchanan's population failed to grow: deaths outnumbered births, and only through immigration from the United States was the community able to avoid a substantial decline.

Economy 

Buchanan is the port for the 155 miles (250 km) railway that brings iron ore from the mines at Yekepa, Nimba County. Originally built by the now defunct Liberian-American-Swedish Minerals Company (LAMCO), the rail line has now (as of 2012) been revitalized by the Arcelor Mittal Company. Rubber and palm oil once were also shipped out of the Port of Buchanan. Africa's first iron-ore washing and pelletizing plant was opened in Buchanan in 1968. This plant was severely damaged during the first Liberian civil war (1989-1996). Stephen Ellis writes that during early 1994, ECOMOG '..Nigerian troops dismantled, and exported as second-hand plant or as scrap metal, industrial equipment worth some $50 million' which had remained intact when the port had earlier been occupied by the National Patriotic Front of Liberia, Charles Taylor's faction. It is reported that the plant was later sold off as scrap metal to a Chinese buyer in 2010.

Buchanan Renewable Energies, a firm based in Toronto, Canada, that processes chips from rubber tree trunks into biofuel, has begun operations in the city.

According to the managing-director of Liberia's National Port Authority, Togba Ngangana, Chinese investors have signed a memorandum of understanding to build a manufacturing zone outside the southern port of Buchanan which would produce 50,000 jobs. This is in addition to an undisclosed amount of low-interest loans, debt relief and other incentives.

Notable residents 
 Marcus Andreasson, Retired professional football player, was born in Buchanan
 Joseph James Cheeseman, the 12th President of Liberia, was born in Edina, Grand Bassa County, north of Buchanan
 Dessaline Harris, Justice of the Supreme Court, 1954-1966
 Daniel Edward Howard, President of Liberia, 1912-1920
 Joakim Sundström, Swedish sound editor, sound designer and musician, was brought up in Buchanan

See also 
Doris Williams Stadium
Railway stations in Liberia

References 

 
1835 establishments in Liberia
Populated places established by Americo-Liberians
Grand Bassa County
County capitals in Liberia
Port cities in Liberia
Populated places established in 1835